William Paget, 1st Baron Paget of Beaudesert  (15069 June 1563), was an English statesman and accountant who held prominent positions in the service of Henry VIII, Edward VI and Mary I.

Early life
He was the son of John Pachett or Paget, one of the serjeants-at-mace of the city of London. He was born in Staffordshire in 1506, and was educated at St Paul's School when William Lily was its headmaster, and at Trinity Hall, Cambridge, proceeding afterwards to the University of Paris. At St Paul's, he befriended the future antiquary John Leland and later acted as one of his benefactors.

Political career
He served as Member of Parliament for Lichfield in 1529 and for Middlesex in 1545.

Probably through the influence of Stephen Gardiner, who had early befriended Paget, he was employed by King Henry VIII in several important diplomatic missions; in 1532 he was appointed Clerk of the Signet and soon afterwards of the privy council. He became secretary to Anne of Cleves in 1539 and was appointed Clerk of the Parliaments on 15 July 1541, although it seems likely that he never discharged the duties of this office in person, but rather through others. In April 1543 he was sworn of the privy council and appointed secretary of state, in which position Henry VIII relied on his advice, at last appointing him one of the council to act during the minority of King Edward VI.

Paget at first vigorously supported the protector Somerset, while counselling a moderation which Somerset did not always observe. Paget would go on to become increasingly alienated from the Duke, reaching out to him in a series of letters from February 1548 in which he tried to persuade Somerset to take others' opinions into consideration. He blamed Somerset's dictatorial style and foolish attempts to help the poor for the Prayer Book Rebellion in 1549. In 1547 he was made controller of the king's household, Chancellor of the Duchy of Lancaster, elected knight of the shire (MP) for Staffordshire and made a knight of the Garter; and in 1549 he was summoned by writ to the House of Lords as Baron Paget de Beaudesert (at which point he ceased to be the Clerk of the Parliaments). About the same time he obtained extensive grants of lands, including Cannock Chase and Burton Abbey in Staffordshire, in London the residence of the bishops of Exeter, afterwards known successively as Lincoln House and Essex House, on the site now occupied by the Outer Temple in the London, and also in 1547 he was granted the lordship and manor of Harmondsworth. He obtained Beaudesert in Staffordshire, which remained the chief seat of the Paget family.

Paget shared Somerset's disgrace, being committed to the Tower in 1551 and degraded from the Order of the Garter in the following year, besides suffering a heavy fine by the Star Chamber for having profited at the expense of the Crown in his administration of the duchy of Lancaster. He was, however, restored to the king's favour in 1553, and was one of the twenty-six peers who signed Edward's settlement of the crown on Lady Jane Grey in June of that year. He made his peace with Queen Mary I, who reinstated him as a knight of the Garter and in the privy council in 1553, and appointed him Lord Privy Seal in 1556. On the accession of Queen Elizabeth I in 1558, Paget retired from public life.

Descendants
By his wife Anne Preston, Paget had four sons and five daughters.

Sons:

 Henry (c.1539 – 28 December 1568)
 Thomas (c.1540–1589)
 Charles
 Edward (died young)

Daughters:

 Etheldreda, who married Sir Christopher Allen
 Eleanor, who married firstly, Jerome Palmer, esquire, and secondly, Sir Rowland Clarke
 Grisold, who married firstly, Sir Thomas Rivett, and secondly, Sir William Waldegrave
 Joan (or Jane), who married Sir Thomas Kitson
 Dorothy, who married Sir Thomas Willoughby (died 1559)
 Anne (died 1590), who married Sir Henry Lee.

Paget's two eldest sons, Henry and Thomas, succeeded in turn to the peerage. Henry was raised to the peerage as Baron Burton during his father's lifetime. Charles was a well-known Catholic conspirator during the reign of Queen Elizabeth I; Thomas was suspected of complicity in Charles's plots and was attainted in 1587.

References

Bibliography:

 
 

Attribution:
 

|-

|-

1506 births
1563 deaths
Alumni of Trinity Hall, Cambridge
Chancellors of the Duchy of Lancaster
Lords Privy Seal
Peers of England created by Edward VI
Knights of the Garter
Lord-Lieutenants of Middlesex
People educated at St Paul's School, London
William
Clerks of the Privy Council
Prisoners in the Tower of London
English MPs 1529–1536
English MPs 1545–1547
16th-century English nobility
16th-century English politicians
Clerks of the Parliaments
Court of Henry VIII
Barons Paget